The fourth series of Junior Bake Off aired from 7 November 2016, with forty contestants competing to be crowned the series 4 winner. Sam Nixon and Mark Rhodes returned to present the show, and Allegra McEvedy returned as judge with Nadiya Hussain replacing Graham Hornigold. McEvedy and Hussain decided to call themselves the cookery panel. Nikki Lilly won the series. This was Allegra McEvedy, Nadiya Hussain, Sam Nixon and Mark Rhodes’ last series as the junior bake off family and it was the last series on CBBC.

Contestants
 Quarter-finalist
 Semi-finalist
 Finalist
 Winner
 Withdrew

Episodes

Episode 1
Note Nadiya Hussain replaces Graham Hornigold for one of the judges.

Episode 2

Episode 3

Episode 4

Episode 5

Episode 6

Episode 7

Episode 8

Episode 9

Episode 10

Episode 11: Quarter-Final

Notes

Episode 12: Quarter-Final

Episode 13: Semi-Final

Episode 14: The Final – Day One
Marcus Butler & Oli White joins this episode of junior bake off 2016.

Episode 15: The Final – Day Two

Ratings

References

External links
 

The Great British Bake Off
2016 British television seasons